Manipontonia psamathe is a species of saltwater shrimp that was first described in 1902.

References

External links
 

Palaemonoidea
Crustaceans described in 1902